Lorimar Productions, Inc., later known as Lorimar Television and Lorimar Distribution, was an American production company that was later a subsidiary of Warner Bros., active from 1969 until 1993, when it was folded into Warner Bros. Television (which is currently known as Warner Bros. Television Studios). It was founded by Irwin Molasky, Merv Adelson, and Lee Rich. The company's name was a portmanteau of Adelson's then wife, Lori and Palomar Airport.

The firm "expanded from television and movies into advertising" in the 1980s.

History

Early years and merger with Telepictures (1969–1986) 
In the late 1960s, after a bank loan of $185,000 that Merv Adelson planned to furnish Lee Rich with, Lorimar Productions was founded. Prior to Lorimar, Rich had an established reputation; first as an advertising executive at Benton & Bowles, then as a television producer, co-producing (with Walter Mirisch) successful series such as The Rat Patrol.

Lorimar initially produced made-for-television movies for the ABC Movie of the Week. Rich bought the script to an adaptation of Earl Hamner Jr.'s novel The Homecoming and subsequently sold the rights to CBS. The Homecoming: A Christmas Story, airing during the 1971 holiday season, was a ratings success, and served as the pilot for Lorimar's first major hit, The Waltons, which premiered in 1972. Throughout the 1970s, Lorimar produced a number of hit shows, including Eight Is Enough; of these, the most popular by far was Dallas.

In 1976, Lorimar had to enter the syndication business. It also operated such subsidiaries such as Lorimar Television, Lorimar Pictures, Lorimar Syndication, and Lorimar Distribution International during the time. On March 3, 1978, Robert B. Morin became executive vice president of the Lorimar Syndication unit. Later that year, CBS vice president Edward O. Denault was named vice president of that production unit. It was served for the next nine years, until 1987. In 1980, Lorimar purchased the Allied Artists Pictures Corporation library.

In the 1984–1985 season, three of the top 10 shows in the United States were produced by Lorimar; Dallas, Knots Landing, and Falcon Crest. In the mid-1980s, Lorimar's output swung toward family-friendly sitcoms; among these were The Hogan Family (initially titled Valerie), Perfect Strangers, and Full House, which were produced by Miller-Boyett Productions. On June 6, 1985, Lorimar decided to expand into first-run syndication, and wanted to pick up eight series, with the acquisition of syndicated rights to the CBS game show Press Your Luck.

In October 1985, Lorimar, in an attempt to expand into first-run syndication, announced it would merge with television syndication firm Telepictures, becoming Lorimar-Telepictures. That same year Lorimar announced their intention to buy a 15% share in the then-financially troubled Warner Communications. On February 19, 1986, the Lorimar-Telepictures merger was completed and the company started trading on the New York Stock Exchange as "LT." In 1986 they purchased the Metro-Goldwyn-Mayer studio lot in Culver City, as well as the Metrocolor laboratory from Ted Turner. L-T turned around and sold off the Metrocolor facility to Technicolor for $60 million. Around that same year, Rich left the company and moved to MGM. The New York Times followed the financial fortunes of Lorimar Telepictures.

Purchase by Warner Communications and merger with Warner Bros. Television (1987–1993) 
In 1987, Lorimar-Telepictures's production arm became Lorimar Television, and, the L-T distribution business was rebranded as Lorimar Syndication. Also that same year, it is reported that R. Robert Rosenbaum was named vice president of production at the Lorimar Television unit. This was part of a strategy on January 19, 1987, in which the parent company Lorimar-Telepictures had used Lorimar as a operating name for its units. That year, Lorimar Television attempted to do a television version of the popular TV Guide magazine, in order to have a revenue of larger market affiliates that tried to buy its proposed access strip for 1988–1989, and the station could earn $58,000 in its first year of stripping, but the show was never materialized.

On January 11, 1989, Lorimar was purchased by Warner Communications, which the following year merged with Time Inc. to form Time Warner. Lorimar's distribution business was folded into Warner Bros. Television Distribution and became Warner Bros. Domestic Television Distribution; since then, the Telepictures name has been resurrected as both a production company (circa 1990), and once again as a syndication company (1995).

The former MGM studio lot was sold to Sony to house Columbia Pictures, TriStar Pictures, and Sony's other operations towards the end of 1989 with the facilities renamed as Columbia Studios (now Sony Pictures Studios) at the beginning of 1990. Lorimar continued as a production company until September 1993, when it was eventually folded into Warner Bros. Television, for "economic issues" as a result of declining syndication sales. In 1990, David Salzman left Lorimar to start Millennium Productions to cover affiliated production houses like Lorimar and Telepictures. In 1991, after Orion Pictures shut down its television unit, before its eventual Chapter 11 bankruptcy protection, Gary Nardino moved to Lorimar, taking its current Orion-produced shows with them, and also took talent deals (Thomas Carter, Robert Townsend, Paul Stojanovich, Clifton Campbell and Deborah Joy LeVine) with them. In 1992, Barbara Corday, former CBS executive, struck a deal with the studio.

The last series to premiere under the Lorimar name was Time Trax, as part of the Prime Time Entertainment Network programming block. Several shows slated to be Lorimar productions, such as Lois & Clark: The New Adventures of Superman, Living Single, It Had to Be You, Café Americain, The Trouble with Larry and Family Album ended up being produced by Warner Bros.

Les Moonves, who would later become the chairman and CEO of CBS Corporation, was the president and CEO of Lorimar Television from 1990 to 1993. Moonves then became the chairman of Warner Bros. Television after the merger with Lorimar.

Key components Lorimar owned 
Additionally, Lorimar owned key components of the film library of the defunct Allied Artists film studio (originally Monogram Pictures), which includes Cabaret and Papillon; these, too, are now owned by Warner. After the merger with Telepictures, they also took possession of the Rankin/Bass Animated Entertainment animation house, along with the post-1973 library of that company, including its entry into the 1980s animation market, ThunderCats, which ran until 1989; a Warner Bros. Animation-produced revival show aired on Cartoon Network for one season in 2011.

Other ventures

Theatrical films 
Lorimar was not restricted to producing television programs; they also sporadically produced theatrical motion pictures, most of which were originally distributed by other studios. Lorimar's entrance into feature films was predominantly sanctioned by Adelson; Rich was vehemently against it. This asset was among the many factors that led to Rich's exit from the studio in 1986.

In late 1984, they had a film production unit known as Lorimar Motion Pictures (or, sometimes, as Lorimar Pictures). That year, on August 28, 1985, Sidney Lumet had signed a director-producer pact with Lorimar Motion Pictures to develop feature films. In 1985, it entered into a partnership with Producers Sales Organization, handling worldwide sales, and 20th Century Fox, which would handle North American distribution rights to many of its theatrical films. In 1986, Lorimar Film Partners was climbed to $26.9 million and decided to have five more pictures to put into the development and production hopper, and all Lorimar films would be exclusively to the partnership via Lorimar Motion Picture Management. On May 21, 1986, Lorimar Motion Pictures had signed participation agreements with a joint venture of 20th Century Fox and The Walt Disney Company called U.K. Film Distributors in the United Kingdom, France's UGC and German's Neue Constantin Film to handle international sales of Lorimar's films, along with Toho-Towa in Japan in order to gave Lorimar the leading territory distributor.

In January 1987, the film unit was renamed Lorimar Film Entertainment to coincide with its newly formed in-house distribution unit. Lorimar previously had a distribution agreement with 20th Century Fox for two years between 1985 and 1987, before starting its own distribution unit. That year, New Century/Vista Film Co., a joint venture of The Vista Organization and New Century Entertainment, is starting to be represented by Lorimar themselves for international distribution, particularly overseas sales of the joint venture's films.

That year, in February 1987, it inked a distribution agreement with Greenfox Productions to handle worldwide distribution theatrically and all other media on the horror film sequel Return of the Living Dead Part II, which was rolled on a $6 million budget in royalties handled by the production company. In May 1987, Craig Bamgaurten, who has been with Lorimar Motion Pictures since 1984, announced that he would resign his post as president in December, and Peter Chernin took over as president of the umbrella arm Lorimar Film Entertainment. That year, in late May 1987 Lorimar and Vista Organization decided to extend the pictures from the original seven count to ten, including the three pictures stated by Vista, Rented Lips, Pass the Ammo and Fright Night Part II, were disclosed by the staff of both Vista and Lorimar International representatives.

In 1988, Lorimar made a distribution deal with Warner Bros. Under Warner, Lorimar continued to make theatrical films until 1990. The theatrical film library of Lorimar was folded into Warner Bros. Pictures.

Warner Bros. now owns most of Lorimar's catalogue, though a few films remained with their original distributors.

Home video 
In 1984, Lorimar purchased Karl Video Corporation (KVC), also known as Karl Home Video, which was named after its founder, Stuart Karl (1953–1991). KVC, which was best known for producing the bestselling Jane Fonda; Jane Fonda's Workout, was renamed Karl-Lorimar Home Video after the acquisition. In 1985, Karl-Lorimar inked a deal to distribute movie titles by Lorimar Motion Pictures and had to release 6 to 12 theatrical feature films a year.

The company was expanded by 1986, when Karl-Lorimar was allowed to distribute titles by VCL Communications, in order that Karl-Lorimar would have 12-16 VCL titles a year, and received an agreement with De Laurentiis Entertainment Group to distribute the film's catalog on video cassette, and had the establishment of an international video label that was operated as a subsidiary of Karl-Lorimar, Lorimar Home Video, with a deal that enabled the titles to be released on home video in the UK by Guild Home Video.

On April 23, 1986, Karl-Lorimar Home Video had entered into the direct-to-video film foray when it entered into an agreement with L/A House Productions for eight $400,000 romance novel motion pictures, and call for Karl/Lorimar to release the first four this fall, with $11.95 each. On July 16, 1986, Karl-Lorimar Home Video had inked an agreement with The Video Collection in order to distribute children's, family and special interest programs for the British market, and would also release Scholastic-Lorimar Home Video releases for the whole entire British market.

On August 27, 1986, Karl-Lorimar Home Video received $5 million in order to launch a new broadcasting-style home video branding "KLV-TV", which the slogan was "Your Personal Network", and decided that Karl-Lorimar's home video titles decided to escape the "least-objectionable-programming" standard that supposedly rules broadcast television, and a similar situation that was arising in the home video business when consumers can rarely rent the title they go to the store and pick up. The KLV-TV program would include the creation of retail outlet affiliates who would carry Karl/Lorimar product in a special section, display the KLV-TV emblem in front of the store and will benefit from an "aggressive" cooperation ad fund. Karl/Lorimar was planning national or regional affiliate meetings on a regular basis, and have plans for KLV-TV to overshadow the Karl/Lorimar name on the consumer label, but it was failed.

Meanwhile, on October 15, 1986, Lorimar Home Video, the international branch of Karl/Lorimar Home Video, a division of Lorimar/Telepictures offered at MIPCOM to Karl/Lorimar's alternative programming strategy as the company's prime offering, with overseas tie-ins. Lorimar Home Video's marketing plan is not looking for licensees, but rather joint venture partners, and Jeffrey Schlessinger, who was Lorimar's executive said that the current rental-to-sell-through ratio overseas won't make the startup essay, but adds that Lorimar Home Video is out to "create a new market".

The Shades of Love direct-to-video romance series has grown into $1 million video only productions that Karl/Lorimar had set the first four by March 1987, and the other four for September 1987, and had the input of Canadian video distributor Astral Film Enterprises, which handled television distribution of the direct-to-video series for the entire Canadian market, and Karl-Lorimar would have a six-month window in the United States, and tie-ins for the cassettes included novelizations of the movies from Cloverdale Press.

On December 3, 1986, Karl/Lorimar decided to co-produce a new series for home video and television markets, Jazzvisions, which would feature jazz concerts from Herbie Hancock, Antonio Carlos Jobim, John Scofield, George Duke, Tito Puente and Etta James, and culminate in a rare performance from a big-band jazz transcription of Porgy and Bess, which would be held at the Wiltern Theater in Los Angeles, and the home video company in cooperation with music producer Jack Lewis.

In March 1987, Karl/Lorimar Home Video, shortly before Karl resigned, received a seven-picture agreement from international film distributor Cinecom Entertainment Group, to handle video rights to its feature films from 1987/1988, which would gave the video company a "distribution-fee agreement" that also included a substitutional upfront advance, and put Karl/Lorimar onto the $12–14 million range, and it included Lighthorsemen, Deceivers, Gris/Gris, Farm of the Year, Maurice, Sammy and Rosie Get Laid and Swimming to Cambodia, and the unusual, trend-setting deal differs from conventional vid licensing agreements and the popular distribution agreements in that Cinecom will get both a large advantage and a large percentage of vid avenue.

Relationships between Lorimar and Karl grew sour, which forced Karl to resign in March 1987, of which he violated the parent's code of ethics, and forced Karl to be barred from starting a competing company, of which he said it was continued until 1989 for the length of the contract. Karl-Lorimar continued to exist under the name Lorimar Home Video until it closed sometime later. In June 1987, Jerry Gottlieb was named CEO of the Lorimar Home Video division, which would give up his corporate responsibilities as senior VP of its parent company, after Stuart Karl left because he was disclosed that an outside company that the execs handled certain marketing chores unbeknown to the past, and decided to continue making how-to home video programming at the studio, and decided to use the quotas for the typical home video distribution format, and gave them push for the parent company's theatrical pictures. Lorimar Home Video closed in 1988 and was folded into Warner Bros. Home Entertainment.

In Australia, Lorimar joined a venture with Village Roadshow to create Roadshow Lorimar Home Video, which distributed movie titles by Lorimar Motion Pictures in that country.

Television stations

Record label 
In 1979, Lorimar formed Lorimar Records whose first release was the soundtrack to the film The Fish That Saved Pittsburgh. The label would have very few artists signed to it. It was mainly distributed by Columbia Records, but it was also distributed for one album from The Coyote Sisters by Motown via the Morocco subsidiary. Lorimar Records' final release was the soundtrack to Action Jackson (1988) which in that case was distributed by Atlantic Records.

Sports broadcasting

Filmography

TV productions 
Lorimar's TV productions included:

Theatrical feature films 
Most of Lorimar's film and television library, with several exceptions, is now owned by Warner Bros. Several of Lorimar's films are still owned by their original distributors or third parties, which are marked with an asterisk (*).

Advertising agency investments

Kenyon & Eckhardt 

Lorimar acquired Kenyon & Eckhardt, an advertising agency, in 1983.

Bozell 

Lorimar acquired Bozell Jacobs in 1985, and merged it with Kenyon to form Bozell, Jacobs, Kenyon & Eckhardt. The firm renamed to Bozell Worldwide in 1992.

References

External links

Warner Bros.
Defunct film and television production companies of the United States
Entertainment companies based in California
Companies based in Los Angeles County, California
Mass media companies established in 1969
1989 mergers and acquisitions
Mass media companies disestablished in 1993
1969 establishments in California
1993 disestablishments in California
Defunct companies based in Greater Los Angeles